The 2023 Colorado Springs mayoral election will be held on April 4, 2023 to elect the mayor of Colorado Springs, Colorado, with a runoff on May 16 if necessary. Incumbent mayor John Suthers is term-limited and cannot seek reelection to a third term in office. The election will be officially nonpartisan. A wide field of candidates filed to run in the election, including several members of municipal government. Colorado Springs has long been a conservative bastion in the state of Colorado, and none of the candidates running to succeed Suthers identified as members of the Democratic Party. Glenn and Gonzalez were identified as the most conservative candidates in the race, with Strand and Williams being more moderate.

Candidates
The following candidates qualified to appear on the ballot.
Sallie Clark, bed and breakfast owner, former Colorado director of USDA Rural Development, former El Paso County commissioner, former Colorado Springs city councilor, former president of the National Association of Counties, and candidate for mayor in 1999 and 2003
Andrew Dalby, RV storage business owner
Darryl Glenn, Penrose Hospital trustee, former El Paso County commissioner, former Colorado Springs city councilor, nominee for U.S. Senate in 2016, and candidate for CO-05 in 2018 (Party affiliation: Republican)
Longinos Gonzalez Jr., El Paso County commissioner (Party affiliation: Republican)
Lawrence Martinez, hospice home care specialist and perennial candidate
Christopher Mitchell, electrical engineer
Yemi Mobolade, restaurateur and former Colorado Springs Small Business Development administrator (Party affiliation: Independent)
Kallan Rodebaugh, standup comedian
Tom Strand, president of the Colorado Springs city council (Party affiliation: Independent)
John Tiegen, former CIA security contractor
Jim Miller, tire business owner
Wayne Williams, at-large city councilor and former Colorado Secretary of State (Party affiliation: Republican)

Endorsements

Results

References

External links 
Official campaign websites
 Sallie Clark (R) for Mayor
 Andrew Dalby for Mayor
 Darryl Glenn (R) for Mayor
 Longinos Gonzalez (R) for Mayor
 Christopher Mitchell for Mayor
 Yemi Mobolade (I) for Mayor
 Wayne Williams (R) for Mayor
 John Tiegen (I) for Mayor
 Kallan Rodebaugh (I) for Mayor

2023
2023 Colorado elections
2023 United States mayoral elections